The Israeli Women's Volleyball First League is the most important Israeli women's volleyball competition organized by the Israeli Volleyball Association ( איגוד הכדורעף בישראל, IVA ), it was established in 1960.

History
In the 2018/19 season of the Israeli Women's Volleyball League 10 teams has participated in the regular season : "Maccabi (Haifa), Hapoel (Kfar Sava), Maccabi (Raanana), KK (Tel Aviv), Hapoel Irony (Kiryat Ata), Menashe-Hadera (Emek-Hefer), Academy. (Netanya), Maccabi (Nazareth), Maccabi (Hodh-ha-Sharon), ASA Ben-Gurion (Beer Sheva). The championship title was won for the second time in a row by Maccabi (Haifa), who won the final series beating Hapoel (Kfar Sava) 3-0 (3:1, 3:1, 3:1). The 3rd place went to Maccabi (Raanana).

Winners list

References

External links
 Israeli Volleyball Association 
  Israel Premier League. women.volleybox.net 

Israel
Volleyball in Israel
Israel
Professional sports leagues in Israel